New Life (Dedicated to Max Gordon) is a 1976 big band jazz album recorded by the Thad Jones/Mel Lewis Jazz Orchestra and released on the A&M/Horizon Records label.  The album was nominated for a 1976 Grammy award in the Best Jazz Performance by a Big Band category.

Track listing 
All songs composed and arranged by Thad Jones except where noted.

Side A
 "Greetings And Salutations" – 8:49
 "Love And Harmony" (comp./arr. C. Bridgewater) – 7:23
 "Little Rascal On A Rock" – 6:17

Side B
 "Forever Lasting" – 5:50
 "Love To One Is One To Love" – 4:07
 "Thank You" (comp./arr. Dodgion) – 6:10
 "Cherry Juice" – 5:45

Personnel 

 Thad Jones – flugelhorn (tracks A2, A3, B1-4)
 Mel Lewis – drums
 Herb Lovelle – drums (tracks B1, B2)
 Roland Hanna – piano (tracks A1, A2, B1-3)
 Walter Norris – piano (tracks A3, B2, B4)
 George Mraz – bass (tracks A1-3, B3, B4)
 Steve Gilmore – acoustic bass (tracks B1, B2) 
 Rasan Mfalme (Jerry Jemmott) – electric bass (track B1)
 Barry Finnerty – electric guitar (track A1)
 David Spinozza – electric guitar (track B1)
 Leonard Gibbs – congas (tracks A1, B1)
 Jerry Dodgion – alto saxophone, flute, soprano saxophone
 Frank Foster – tenor saxophone, clarinet (tracks A1-3, B3, B4)
 Lou Marini – clarinet, flute, tenor saxophone (tracks A1 (intro), B1, B2) 
 Greg Herbert – tenor saxophone, flute
 Ed Xiques – soprano saxophone, alto saxophone, flute, clarinet
 Pepper Adams – baritone saxophone
 Al Porcino – trumpet (tracks A1-3, B3, B4)
 Jon Faddis – trumpet (tracks B1, B2)
 Lew Soloff – trumpet (tracks B1, B2)
 Waymon Reed – trumpet (tracks A1-3, B3, B4) 
 Steve Furtado – trumpet (tracks B1, B2)
 Sinclair Acey – trumpet (tracks A1-3, B3, B4)
 Jim Bossy – trumpet (tracks B1, B2)
 Cecil Bridgewater – trumpet
 Billy Campbell – trombone
 Janice Robinson – trombone
 Earl McIntyre – bass trombone (tracks A1-3, B3, B4), trombone (tracks B1, B2)
 John Mosca – trombone (tracks A1-3, B3, B4)
 Dave Taylor – bass trombone (tracks B1, B2)
 Jim Buffington – French horn (tracks A1, B1, B2)
 Ray Alonge – French horn (tracks A1, B1, B2)
 Peter Gordon – French horn (tracks A1, B1, B2)
 Earl Chapin – French horn (tracks B1, B2)
 Julius Watkins – French horn (track A1)
 Don Butterfield – tuba (tracks B1, B2)

References 

 A&M Horizon  SP707

External links
 New Life at:
 [ Allmusic]
 discogs.com

The Thad Jones/Mel Lewis Orchestra albums
1976 albums
Horizon Records albums